Conventional wisdom mey refer to: 
Conventional wisdom, certain ideas or explanations that are generally accepted as true by the public 
"Conventional Wisdom", a song by Built to Spill from their 2006 album You in Reverse
"My Conventional Wisdom", an episode of Scrubs